Kaura may refer to:

People
 Katuutire Kaura (1941–2022), Namibian politician
 Kaura Khan Qaisrani (born 1812), chieftain of the Qaisrani tribe in Balochistan, Pakistan
 Satish Kumar Kaura (born 1944), Indian technocrat and industrialist

Places
 Kaura, Iran, a village in Fars Province, Iran
 Kaura, Kaduna State, Nigeria, a local government area
 Kaura Lighthouse, a lighthouse located in the municipality of Roan in Sør-Trøndelag county, Norway
 Kaura Namoda, a local government area in Zamfara State, Nigeria

Other uses
 Kaura (band), an American progressive alternative rock band from Los Angeles, California formed in 2005
 Kaura (dance), a traditional folk dance indigenous to Nepal
 Kaura, the former German submarine U-995, used by Norway after World War II
 Kaurna peoples of the Adelaide Plains area, South Australia, sometimes spelt Kaura
 Kaurna language

See also